Barney Brown (October 23, 1907 – October 1, 1985) was an American Negro league baseball pitcher and outfielder who played from 1931 to 1949. Among the teams he played for were the Cuban House of David/Pollock's Cuban Stars, Philadelphia Stars, and New York Black Yankees.

Early life and death
Brown was born in Hartsville, South Carolina and served in the US Army during World War II. He died in Philadelphia, Pennsylvania.

References

External links
 and Baseball-Reference Black Baseball stats and Seamheads

1907 births
1985 deaths
Cuban House of David players
New York Black Yankees players
Pollock's Cuban Stars players
Philadelphia Stars players
Baseball players from North Carolina
African Americans in World War II
United States Army personnel of World War II
Baseball outfielders
Baseball pitchers
African-American United States Army personnel